A list of films produced by the Israeli film industry in 1951.

1951 releases

See also
1951 in Israel

References

External links
 Israeli films of 1951 at the Internet Movie Database

Israeli
Film
1951